Abiodun Ayoyinka (1960) is a  Nigerian comic actor and is also known as Papa Ajasco.

Filmography 
Papa Ajasco & Company
Papa Ajasco & Company

See also
List of Nigerian comedians

References 

1960 births
Living people
Yoruba actors
21st-century Nigerian male actors
Nigerian male comedians
Nigerian male television actors
20th-century Nigerian male actors